The 1964 Grantland Rice Bowl was an NCAA College Division game following the 1964 season, between the Muskingum Fighting Muskies and the Middle Tennessee Blue Raiders. This was the inaugural playing of the bowl.

Notable participants
Middle Tennessee defensive back Boots Donnelly would later serve as head coach for Austin Peay and Middle Tennessee; he was inducted to the College Football Hall of Fame in 2013. Muskingum head coach Ed Sherman was inducted to the College Football Hall of Fame in 1996. Inductees of the Sports Hall of Fame at Middle Tennessee include Boots Donnelly, defensive lineman Keith Atchley, quarterback Teddy Morris, and head coach Charles "Bubber" Murphy.

Scoring summary

References

Further reading

External links
 game photo featuring Boots Donnelly

Grantland Rice Bowl
Grantland Rice Bowl
Middle Tennessee Blue Raiders football bowl games
Muskingum Fighting Muskies football bowl games
Murfreesboro, Tennessee
Grantland Rice Bowl
Grantland Rice Bowl